Manado Malay, or simply the Manado language, is a creole language spoken in Manado, the capital of North Sulawesi province in Indonesia, and the surrounding area. Since Manado Malay is used primarily for spoken communication, there is no standard orthography.

It is derived from North Moluccan Malay (Ternate Malay), which can be evidenced by the number of Ternate loanwords in its lexicon. Manado Malay has been displacing the indigenous languages of the area.

Phonology

Vowels
The vowel system of Manado Malay consists of five vowel phonemes.

Consonants
Manado Malay has nineteen consonants and two semivowels.

Stress
Most words in Manado Malay have stress on the pre-final syllable:

However, there are also many words with final stress:

Grammar

Pronouns

Personal

Possessives
Possessives are built by adding  to the personal pronoun or name or noun, then followed by the 'possessed' noun. Thus  has the function similar to English "'s" as in "the doctor's uniform".

Interrogative words
The following are the interrogative words or "w-words" in Manado Malay:

Grammatical aspect
 ('to be') can be used in Manado Malay to indicate the perfective aspect, e.g.:
 = 'They already went down to Wenang'
 = 'We ate already' or 'We have eaten already'
 = 'me', 'myself', 'I' or 'we', 'us'
 = 'we', 'us'.

Nasal final
 (Indonesian ) = 'to eat',
 (Indonesian ) = 'to walk',
 (Indonesian ) = 'to shower', etc.

Prefix

"ba-" prefix
The ber- prefix in Indonesian, which serves a function similar to the English -ing, is modified into ba- in Manado Malay. E.g.:  ('walking'),  ('swimming'),  ('laying eggs')

"ma(°)-" prefix
° = ng, n, or m depending on phonological context.

The me(°)- prefix in standard Indonesian, which also serves a function to make a verb active, is modified into ma(°)- in Manado Malay. E.g.:  ('hooking fish'),  ('dancing'),  ('searching'),  ('cooking'),  ('crying').

Influences

Loanwords
Due to the historical presence of the Dutch and the Portuguese in eastern Indonesia, several Manado Malay words originate from their languages. However, there is little influence from the local Minahasan languages, and borrowings from Spanish are not very prominent either – in spite of the historical Spanish dominance – suggesting that Manado Malay was transplanted from outside the Minahasa region. On the other hand, Portuguese influence is comparatively significant, considering that the Portuguese presence in the area was relatively limited. There is also a layer of loanwords from the non-Austronesian language of Ternate, which was controlled by the Portuguese in the period 1512–1655.

Indonesian loanwords from Manado Malay
Several words in Manado Malay are loaned to standard Indonesian:
Originally a loanword from Ternate, it has spread through Manado Malay into other regions of Indonesia.

Examples
Examples :
 	= I
 	= you
 	= we
 	= they
 	= yes
 	= no (' = glottal stop)

Sentences :
  : My mother went to the market
  : You haven't eaten since yesterday.
  : Don't lie to me!
  :  We can surely it.

References

Works cited

External links

 Alkitab Bahasa Manado, the first Bible translation into Manado Malay (2017).
 Manado Malay-English-Indonesian Dictionary, Webonary.

Agglutinative languages
Malay-based pidgins and creoles
Languages of Sulawesi